West Mugirango Constituency is an electoral constituency in Kenya. It is one of four constituencies of Nyamira County. The constituency was established for the 1966 elections from what was a larger North Mugirango Constituency.

Members of Parliament

Wards 
Prior to 2013, West Mugirango Constituency had twelve wards: Kebirigo, Nyamira, Rangenyo, Sironga, part of Bogichora, part of Bonyamatuta, Gesiaga, Keera, Miruka-Nyamaiya, Motagara and Sironga. However, ward boundaries and some of the names were revised to five, namely: Bogichora, Bonyamatuta,  Bosamaro, Nyamaiya and Township.

Nyamira South Sub-county
Nyamira South Sub-county shares common boundaries with West Mugirango Constituency. The Sub-county is headed by the sub-county administrator, appointed by a County Public Service Board.

References 

Constituencies in Nyamira County
Constituencies in Nyanza Province
1966 establishments in Kenya
Constituencies established in 1966